The men's 1500 metres event at the 1971 European Athletics Indoor Championships was held on 13 and 14 March in Sofia.

Medalists

Results

Heats
Held on 13 March

First 2 from each heat (Q) qualified directly for the final.

Final
Held on 14 March

References

1500 metres at the European Athletics Indoor Championships
1500